Iridana exquisita, the exquisite sapphire gem, is a butterfly in the family Lycaenidae. It is found in Ghana, western Nigeria, Cameroon, the Republic of the Congo and Gabon. The habitat consists of forests.

References

Butterflies described in 1898
Poritiinae
Butterflies of Africa
Taxa named by Henley Grose-Smith